The sixth season of Objetivo Fama ran from February to May 2009. The season featured a panel of judges that included returning judges Roberto Sueiro and Hilda Ramos, and newcomer judge, singer Abraham. He replaced Fernando Allende. At that time, it was the final season, being dubbed as Objetivo Fama: La Despedida. It was hosted by Puerto Rican singer Gisselle.

In 2019, producer Soraya Sanchez announced that a new season of the show would be produced for 2020 to mainly feature Urbano music, Reggaeton and Trap.

Auditions
Auditions were held in several towns and cities of Puerto Rico.

Final Cutdown
Out of each audition, a group of 16 contestants were selected. Like the first season, this featured only Puerto Rican contestants.

The 16 selected contestants were:

* Age was taken at the beginning of the contest (2009)

Weekly Shows

Quarter-finals

First Show: February 7
The songs performed during the first show were:

The two contestants threatened that night were Jose Anibal and Jorge
The show featured a special presentation from host Giselle, Circo, Limi-T 21 and Angel & Khriz.
Judith was praised as the best of the night, because of her strong vocals and magnificent stage presence.
Hannani was commented on her strong vocals.
Tannia and Victor were commented on doing a good job also

Second Show: February 14
The songs performed during the second show were:

Jorge was chosen to leave the competition
The two contestants threatened that night were Leidy D. and Andres
The show featured a special presentation from Miguelito.
Jose Ruben and Fabian were praised as the best of the night.

Third Show: February 21
The songs performed during the third show were:

Leidy D. was chosen to leave the competition
The two contestants threatened that night were Jose Anibal and Andres. Jose Anibal was threatened as a punishment for violating the rules on the studio-house.
The show featured a special presentation from Arcangel.
Jose Anibal, Marko and Saul were praised as the best of the night.

Fourth Show: February 28
The songs performed during the fourth show were:

Andres was chosen to leave the competition.
The three contestants threatened that night were Tania, Victor and Hecmarie.
The show featured a special presentation from La Secta Allstar.
Jose Anibal, Fabian and Hannani were praised as the best of the night. Urayoan was also praised.

Fifth Show: March 7
The songs performed during the fifth show were:

Tania was chosen to leave the competition.
The three contestants threatened that night were Amesis, Saul and Urayoan.
The show featured a special presentation from R.K.M & Ken-Y & MJ.
Jose Ruben and Victor were the best of the night.

Sixth Show: March 14
The songs performed during the sixth show were:

Saul was chosen to leave the competition.
The three contestants threatened that night were Marko, Zugeil and Hecmarie.
The show featured a special presentation from Fanny Lú, who also served as judge. Jerry Rivera performed with Fabian his song Vuela Alto.
Fabian and Hannani were praised as the best of the night. Jose Anibal, Urayoan and Victor were also praised.

Semi-finals

Seventh Show: March 21
The songs performed during the seventh show were:

Zugeil was chosen to leave the competition.
The show featured a special presentation from Yolandita Monge. Franco El Gorila and Jayco opened the show with the contestants.
Fabian and Marko were praised as the best of the night. Jose Ruben was also praised.

Eight Show: March 28
The songs performed during the eight show were:

Urayoan was chosen to leave the competition.
The show featured a special presentation from Amaia Montero. Elvis Crespo opened the show.
Hannani was praised as the best of the night. Amesis was also praised.

Ninth Show: April 4
The songs performed during the ninth show were:

Judith was chosen to leave the competition.
The show featured a special presentation from La Quinta Estación.
Hannani and Fabian were praised as the best of the night. Victor and José Rubén were also praised.

Tenth Show: April 11
The songs performed during the tenth show were:

Amesis was chosen to leave the competition.
The show featured a special presentation from Tercer Cielo. The show was opened by gospel singer and judge Abraham and his wife Bethliza.
Jose Ruben was praised as the best of the night. Fabian was also praised.

Eleventh Show: April 18
The songs performed during the eleventh show were:

Hecmarie was chosen to leave the competition.
The show featured a special presentation from Yomo & Pablo Montero, who sang with Hannani his song Hay Otra En Tu Lugar. The show was opened by Gilberto Santa Rosa and Víctor Manuelle.
Jose Ruben & Hannani were praised as the best of the night.

Twelfth Show: April 26
The songs performed during the eleventh show were:

Victor was chosen to leave the competition.
The show featured a special presentation from Alexis & Fido and Alex Ubago. The show was opened by Melina León.
Jose Ruben, Hannani and Fabian were praised as the best of the night.

Thirteen Show: May 2
The songs performed during the eleventh show were:

Marko was chosen to leave the competition.
The show was opened by Tito El Bambino. Jose Ruben sang with Season 4 contestant, Ivan Lopez, his José José's cover "Si Me Dejas Ahora". Marko sang with Season 5 contestant, Jonathan Rios, Kalimba's hit "No Me Quiero Enamorar". Hannani sang with Season 3 contestant, Mary Ann Acevedo, her song "Mírame". Fabian sang with Season 4 contestant, Victor Santiago, his new single "No Es Cierto". Jose Anibal sang with Season 1 contestant, Sheila Romero, her new single "Créelo"
According to the judges all the performances failed to impress them and the public

Fourteenth Show: May 9
The songs performed during the eleventh show were:

Jose Anibal was chosen to leave the competition
The show featured a special presentation from Chenoa. She also served as the extra judge for the night

References

External links
 

Objetivo Fama
2009 in Puerto Rico